Westley Gough (born 4 May 1988, Hastings) is a New Zealand professional racing cyclist. In 2011 he won the New Zealand National Road Championships ITT.

Gough was in the New Zealand team that beat Great Britain for gold in the team pursuit at the 2005 World Junior Championships in Austria. He gained a silver medal in the individual pursuit at the 2006 World Junior Championships, and he was part of the quartet that won the silver in the team pursuit behind Australia.

He won a bronze medal in the men's team pursuit event at the 2008 Summer Olympics in China. Gough rode in the team's preliminary events, but made way for Hayden Roulston to join the team in the final.  The International Olympic Committee subsequently struck an extra bronze medal for Gough to recognise his contribution to the pursuit team's success. In 2010 Westley Gough won the men's omnium at the New Zealand National Track Championships.

Gough represented New Zealand at the 2010 Commonwealth Games held in Delhi in India.

At the 2012 Summer Olympics, he again won a bronze medal in the men's team pursuit.

He rode for Team Budget Forklifts for the 2014 and 2015 seasons.

Major results

2008
 3rd Prologue Tour of Southland
2009
 2nd Chrono Champenois
2010
 2nd National Championships ITT
2011
 1st  National Championships ITT
 1st Stage 5 Tour of Wellington
 3rd Prologue Tour of Elk Grove
2012
 1st Prologue Tour des Pays de Savoie
2013
 3rd National Championships ITT

References

External links
Athlete bio at 2008 Olympics site
 

Cyclists at the 2008 Summer Olympics
Cyclists at the 2012 Summer Olympics
New Zealand male cyclists
Olympic bronze medalists for New Zealand
Olympic cyclists of New Zealand
New Zealand track cyclists
1988 births
Living people
Olympic medalists in cycling
Cyclists at the 2010 Commonwealth Games
Medalists at the 2012 Summer Olympics
Medalists at the 2008 Summer Olympics
Sportspeople from Hastings, New Zealand
Commonwealth Games medallists in cycling
Commonwealth Games silver medallists for New Zealand
21st-century New Zealand people
Medallists at the 2010 Commonwealth Games